Urban Hansen (October 23, 1908 – July 24, 1986) was a Danish politician for the Social Democratic Party. From 1962 to 1976 he was the Lord Mayor of Copenhagen. He is the inspiration to the housing project Urbanplanen on Amager near Copenhagen.

1908 births
1986 deaths
Mayors of places in Denmark
Social Democrats (Denmark) politicians
Politicians from Copenhagen